Elena Vardanyan (born on April 22, 1984), is an Armenian actress. She is known for her roles as Koko on Kargin Serial, Nelli Vardanovna on Domino (Armenian TV series). She has played in many performances, such as Stop and Everything is selling.

Filmography

External links 
 
 Elena Vardanyan at the KinoPoisk

References

1984 births
Living people
Actresses from Yerevan
Armenian film actresses
21st-century Armenian actresses
Armenian stage actresses